Ragowo Hediprasetyo (born 22 March 1984), mostly known as Didit Hediprasetyo and Didit Prabowo, is an Indonesian fashion designer and socialite. He is the only child of Indonesian politicians Prabowo Subianto and Titiek Soeharto, and the maternal grandson of former Indonesian president Soeharto. He is the second designer after Karl Lagerfeld and the first Asian designer to design the interior and exterior of a special limited run of the BMW Individual 7 Series of which only five were produced.

He rose to prominence after his first design show on Paris Couture Fashion Week Spring/Summer 2010 and during his father's runs for the Indonesian presidency in 2014 and 2019.

Early life and education
Hediprasetyo was born into one of the most powerful families in Indonesia. His father, Prabowo Subianto, is a former chief of the Indonesian Army's Kopassus and Kostrad units and presently serves as Indonesian defense minister after losing two presidential elections. Hediprasetyo's mother, Titiek Soeharto, is the daughter of Indonesia's second president, Soeharto and Siti Hartinah. On his father's side, Hediprasetyo is the grandson of Sumitro Djojohadikusumo, a prominent economist, who served as industry and trade minister (1950-1951) and finance minister (1952-1953 and 1955-1956). He is also the paternal nephew of tycoon Hashim Djojohadikusumo and the maternal nephew of tycoon and convicted murderer Tommy Suharto.

During his childhood, Hediprasetyo considered a range of occupations, such as painter, photographer, historian, theater director and businessman. After joining a Shakespeare theater workshop at Harvard Summer Extension School, he developed his interest in fashion and then took fashion design as his major. He graduated from the Parsons Paris in 2007. He took courses in painting, photography and art history. In 2018, he was nominated as an Art Fellow by the T. Washington Scholars program.

Career
The designer presented his first Spring/Summer 2010 couture show in the salons of the Hôtel de Crillon in January 2010, offering corseted gowns and fitted skirts and shorts, and has since regularly presented collections during Couture week. "I’m trying to focus on younger clientele and offer them couture with a modern twist," he said in 2012, "My ideal woman is someone who is very cultured, who understands the east and west cultures and who appreciates the aesthetic of the old days of couture, but who at the same time doesn’t take it too seriously. She lives in a realistic world. She might be wearing couture going for a coffee with a friend or going to the beach wearing a simple tank top and short."

Hediprasetyo often gives a nod to his Indonesian origins by including Songket, a traditional hand woven Indonesian brocade, in his collections.

References

External links
Official website

1984 births
Living people
People from Jakarta
Fashion designers from Paris
Javanese people
Banyumasan people
Indonesian fashion designers
Indonesian socialites
Cendana family
Djojohadikusumo family
Parsons School of Design alumni